Levicaris is a genus of shrimps belonging to the family Palaemonidae.

The species of this genus are found near Japan.

Species:
 Levicaris mammillata (Edmondson, 1931)

References

Palaemonidae